Bagacay Point Lighthouse is an active lighthouse in Liloan, Cebu, in the Philippines.

Description 

The lighthouse tower stands at a height of 172 feet in an uphill area overlooking the Mactan Channel. It sits on an elevated 5,000-sq m government property. With a focal plane of 146 feet, the third-order flashing light was first lit on 1 April 1905. The present octagonal tower is all masonry and painted white. The landmark was built by virtue of an executive order issued on 28 July 1903 by William Howard Taft, the first American Governor-General of the Philippines  who came to the country in 1900 as president of the Philippine Commission. The point light was originally established in 1857 by the ruling Spanish Government.

For over 100 years, this lighthouse has provided guiding light to mariners, navigators and fishermen from coastal towns in northern Cebu.  It has been a favorite subject of many painters and photographers for its notable architectural design.

All navigational aids in the Philippines are managed by the Philippine Coast Guard.

See also 
 List of lighthouses in the Philippines

References

External links 

 
 Maritime Safety Services Command

Lighthouses completed in 1905
Lighthouses in the Philippines
Buildings and structures in Cebu
Buildings and structures in Metro Cebu
National Historical Landmarks of the Philippines
1905 establishments in the Philippines